Robert Andrew Adams (January 20, 1907 – March 6, 1970) was a Major League Baseball pitcher. He batted and threw right-handed.

He was born in Birmingham, Alabama and died in Jacksonville, Florida.

External links

Philadelphia Phillies players
1907 births
1970 deaths
Baseball players from Birmingham, Alabama